Treason is a lost 1917 silent film war-drama directed by and starring Allen Holubar and costarring Lois Wilson and Dorothy Davenport. It was produced by Bluebird Photoplays and distributed by them through Universal Film Manufacturing Company.

Cast
Allen Holubar - Pettrus Baariot
Lois Wilson - Floria Natarre
Dorothy Davenport - Luella Brysk
Joseph W. Girard - Gergus Natarre 
George C. Pearce - Rodane Keestelt
Edward Hearn - Danick Rysson
Leo Pierson - Jossef Natarre
Burton Law - Dyrkess Ledyard
L. M. Wells - Seddrick Radore

References

External links
Treason at IMDb.com

kinotv.com
lobby poster

1917 films
American silent feature films
American black-and-white films
Films directed by Allen Holubar
Lost American films
1910s American films